The 1994 Scotland rugby union tour of Argentina was a series of matches played in May and June 1994 in Argentina by Scotland national rugby union team. The Scottish side played a total of 6 matches in Argentina, winning only two with 3 loses.



Match summary 
Complete list of matches played by Scotland in Argentina:

 Test matches

Test details

First test

Argentina: 15.Santiago Mesón, 14.Martín Terán, 13.Diego Cuesta Silva, 12.Marcelo Loffreda (capt), 11.Jorge, 10.Del Castillo, 9.Miranda, 8.Camerlinckx, 7.Temperley, 6.Rolando Martín, 5.Pedro Sporleder, 4.Germán Llanes, 3.Patricio Noriega, 2.Angelillo, 1.Corral

Scotland: 15.Dods, 14.Jonier, 13.Jardine, 12.Schiel, 11.Logan, 10.Townsend, 9.Redpath, 8.Hogg, 7.Smith, 6.Walton, 5.Reed (capt), 4.Munro, 3.Burnell, 2.McKenzie, 1.Sharp

Second test

Argentina: S. Mesón; M. Terán, M. Loffreda (capt), D. Cuesta Silva, G. Jorge; G. del Castillo, N. Fernández Miranda; C. Viel Temperley, J.
Santamarina, R. Martín; G. Llanes, P. Sporleder; P. Noriega, J.J. Angelillo, F. Méndez
Scotland: M. Dods; C. Joiner, I. Jardine, G. Shiel, Y.. Logan; G. Townsend, B. Redpath; I.Smith, C. Hogg, P. Walton; A. Reed (capt), S. Munro; P. Burnell, K. McEnzie, A. Sharp

Bibliography

References

Rugby union tours of Argentina
Scotland national rugby union team tours
Scotland
tour
tour